Gabriel López may refer to:

 Gabriel López (footballer, born 1983), Uruguayan footballer
 Gabriel López (footballer, born 2003), Mexican footballer
 Gabriel López (actor) (born 1991), Venezuelan singer and television actor
 Gabriel López Rosado, Mexican politician
 Gabriel López Zapiain, Mexican footballer